The Duquesne Incline is a funicular located near Pittsburgh's South Side neighborhood and scaling Mt. Washington in Pittsburgh, Pennsylvania, United States. Designed by Hungarian-American engineer Samuel Diescher, the incline was completed in 1877.

The lower station is in the Second Empire style. Together with the incline, which rises  in height, at a 30-degree angle, it was listed on the National Register of Historic Places in 1975. The incline is unusual for having a track gauge standard used only in Finland, Russia, and Mongolia.

Together with the Monongahela Incline, it is one of two passenger inclines still in operation on Pittsburgh's South Side. By 1977, the two had become tourist attractions and together served more than one million commuters and tourists annually. That year both inclines were designated as Historic Mechanical Engineering Landmarks by the American Society of Mechanical Engineers (ASME).

History 
Originally steam powered, the Duquesne Incline was designed by Samuel Diescher, a Hungarian-American civil engineer based in Pittsburgh, and completed in 1877.

Diescher is known for having designed the majority of inclines in the United States, including several in Pittsburgh and Pennsylvania, in addition to numerous other industrial and highway projects.

The incline was intended to carry cargo up and down Mt. Washington in the late 19th century. It later carried passengers, particularly Mt. Washington residents who were tired of walking up the steep footpaths to the top of the bluff. Inclines were being built all over Mt. Washington to serve working-class people who were forced out of the lowlying riverfront by industrial development.

But as more roads were built in the twentieth century on “Coal Hill”, as it was known, and automobile use increased, most of the other inclines were closed. By the end of the 1960s, only the Monongahela Incline and the Duquesne Incline remained in operation.

In 1962, the Duquesne Incline was closed, apparently for good. Major repairs were needed, and with so few patrons, the incline's private owners did little. But local Duquesne Heights residents launched a fund-raiser to help restore the incline. It was a huge success, and on July 1, 1963, the incline reopened under the auspices of a non-profit organization dedicated to its preservation.

The incline has since been totally refurbished. The cars, built by the J. G. Brill and Company of Philadelphia, have been stripped of paint to reveal the original wood. An observation deck was added at the top affording a view of Pittsburgh's "Golden Triangle". The Duquesne Incline is now one of the city's most popular tourist attractions. In 1975 it was listed on the National Register of Historic Places. By 1977 the two remaining passenger inclines served more than one million commuters and tourists annually. That year both inclines were designated as Historic Mechanical Engineering Landmarks by the American Society of Mechanical Engineers (ASME).

Statistics
Length:  
Elevation:  
Grade:  30 degrees
Gauge:   broad gauge
Speed:  
Passenger Capacity: 18 to 25 (one compartment) 
Opened:  May 20, 1877
Renovated:  1888 (with steel structure)
Rebuilt:  Original steam power replaced with electricity: 1935
Renovated: Historic cars restored in 1970s

In popular culture 
The incline is featured in the opening scene of The Next Three Days (2010) trailer.  The same scene is featured about halfway through the film.
It is also featured in the 1983 film Flashdance, set in Pittsburgh.
In the 1987 movie Lady Beware, the characters played by Diane Lane and Cotter Smith ride the incline.
 The Duquesne Incline is a featured Pittsburgh landmark on Yinztagram.

Gallery

See also

Angels Flight
Funicular railway
Johnstown Inclined Plane
List of funicular railways
 List of inclines in Pittsburgh
Monongahela Incline

References

External links

Port Authority of Allegheny County: The Inclines
The Duquesne Incline, official web site
Travel Channel video of Incline
HawkinsRails' Duquesne Incline scrapbook
View on Google Maps
[http://pittsburghtransit.org Pittsburgh Transit History Site

Industrial buildings and structures on the National Register of Historic Places in Pennsylvania
Funicular railways in the United States
Tourist attractions in Pittsburgh
Pittsburgh History & Landmarks Foundation Historic Landmarks
Railway inclines in Pittsburgh
Port Authority of Allegheny County
5 ft gauge railways in the United States
National Register of Historic Places in Pittsburgh
Cableways on the National Register of Historic Places
Rail infrastructure on the National Register of Historic Places in Pennsylvania
Historic Mechanical Engineering Landmarks
Railway lines opened in 1877
1877 establishments in Pennsylvania
Industrial buildings and structures in Pittsburgh